Aafke Eshuis (born 24 November 1987 Haarlem) is a Dutch road and track racing cyclist. In 2008, she placed third at the Dutch National Team Time Trial Championships, with Nathalie van Gogh, and Elise van Hage.

She competed at the 2010 Dutch National Track Championships,  2011 Dutch National Track Championships, and 2012 Dutch National Track Championships.

She rode for Parkhotel Valkenburg Continental Team.

References 

1987 births
Dutch female cyclists
Living people
20th-century Dutch women
21st-century Dutch women
Sportspeople from Haarlem
Cyclists from North Holland